The rector (in Latin;) was an official in the government of the Republic of Ragusa. The holder was the head of the executive powers of Ragusa, part of the Small Council (Consilium minus). The rector was seated at the Rector's Palace.

Partial list of rectors of Ragusa

14th century
1358 Nikša Sorgo 
March 1358 Petar Ragnina 
1358 Ivan Pavov Gundulić 
1358 Marin Bona 
October 1358 Nikola Zavernego 
1358 Marin Menze 
1358 Marin Bona    
March 1359 Ivan Cereva
July 1359 Nikša Sorgo 
August 1359 Ivan Bona
1359 Marin Gozze 
September 1359 Lovro Volcacio
October 1359 Savino Bonda 
January 1360 Marin Bona 
March 1360 Jako Menze 
April 1360 Ivan Cerva 
May 1360 Nikola Zavernego 
June 1360 Ivan Nikolin Gundulić
July 1360 Ivan Pavov Gundulić 
August 1360 Nikola Grede 
September 1360 Ivan Bona 
October 1360 Lovro Volcasso 
November 1360 Nikola Sorgo 
December 1360 Petar Ragnina
January 1361 Marin Gozze 
February 1361 Marin Bona 
March 1361 Marin Menze 
April 1361 Savino Bonda 
May 1361 Nikola Caboga
June 1361 Ivan Cerieva 
July 1361 Nikola Saraca 
August 1361 Ivan Gundulić 
September 1361 Andrija Luccari
October 1361 Nikola Zavernego 
November 1361 Vlaho Babalio 
December 1361 Nikola Grede 
January 1362 Lovro Volcasso  
February 1362 Ivan Bona 
March 1362 Jakov Menze 
April 1362 Marin Menze 
May 1362 Ivan Tuidisio
June 1362 Ivan Gundulić
July 1362 Miho Držić
September 1362 Ivan Gundulić 
October 1362 Broccardo Broccardi
November 1362 Nikola Zavernego 
December 1362 Nikola Andrija Sorgo
January 1363 Savino Bonda 
February 1363 Jakov Georgio 
March 1363 Nikola Grede 
April 1363 Lovro Volcasso 
May 1363 Marin Junije Menze
June 1363 Vlaho Lučić
July 1363 Ivan Nikola Gundulić
August 1363 Petranja Bonda
September 1363 Vlaho Babalio 
October 1363 Zoan Puzlo Gondula
November 1363 Nikola Saracha 
December 1363 Grube Menze
January 1364 Ivan Tuidisio
February 1364 Nifficus Galoc
March 1364 Miho Babalio
April 1364 Jakov Georgio 
May 1364 Šimun Slavov Resti
June 1364 Pietro Prodanello
July 1364 Marin Menze 
August 1364 Ivan Bona 
September 1364 Marin Gozze 
October 1364 Nikola Zavernego 
November 1364 Nikola Grede 
December 1364 Vlaho Babalio 
February 1366 Nifficus Galloc
April 1366 Michael Babalio
July 1366 Jakov Giorgio
August 1366 Petragna Bonda
September 1366 Orse Zamagna
October 1366 Vlaho Babalio
November 1366 Ivan Bona
December 1366 Andrija Dobre Bincola
January 1367 Marin Gozze 
March 1367 Petar Prodanello
April 1367 Đuro Jakobov Giorgi 
May 1367 Michael Babalio
June 1367 Grube Menze
July 1367 Jakov Sorgo
December 1367 Džore Giorgi
July 1368 Vito Georgio
May 1369 Andrija Bincola
November 1369 Ivan Grede
December 1369 Michael Babalio
1370 Marko Bobali  
August 1370 Marin Menze
February 1371 Nikola Zavernego
April 1371 Andrija Beneša
May 1371 Petar Gundulić
June 1371 Nikola Caboga
July 1371 Andrija Dobre Bincola
August 1371 Helia Bonda
September 1371 Jakov Georgi
January 1372 Bartol Tudisio  
February 1372 Matej Vitov Đurđević  
March 1372 Polo Baraba
August 1372 Ivan Bona
September 1372 Ivan Grede 
November 1372 Ivan Bona
December 1372 Džore Georgio
January 1373 Andrija Gundulić
March 1373 Andrija Beneša
1373 Klement Toma Držić
February 1374 Vlaho Menze
March 1374 Pavao Baraba
April 1374 Stijepo Sorgo
May 1374 Marin Junije Menze
June 1374 Jakov Sorgo 
September 1374 Ivan Grede 
October 1374 Jakov Menze 
January 1375 Bartol Tudisio 
April 1375 Petar Gundulić 
July 1375 Vlaho Grede 
August 1375 Bartol Tudisio 
November 1375 Jakov Sorgo 
January 1376 Bartol Tudisio 
February 1376 Vlaho Grede 
May 1376 Marin Menze 
July 1376 Petar Gundulić 
September 1376 Andrija Dobre Binciola
October 1376 Jakov Menze 
March 1377 Vlaho Babalio
July 1377 Bartol Tudisio 
1377 Matej Vitov Đurđević      
September 1378 Ivan Grede 
October 1378 Bartol Tudisio 
November 1378 Vlaho Sorgo
December 1378 Vlaho Babalio
January 1379 Vito Gozze
February 1379 Jakov Sorgo
March 1379 Junio Sorgo
April 1379 Andrija Sorgo
May 1379 Marin Bodacia
June 1379 Jakov Menze
July 1379 Vlaho Babalio
August 1379 Miho Martinusso 
September 1379 Jakov Sorgo
October 1379 Marin Junije Menze
November 1379 Michael Babalio
December 1379 Andrija Sorgo
January 1380 Vlaho Sorgo
April 1380 Matej Vitov Đurđević 
May 1380 Bartol Tudisio 
June 1380 Marin Bocignollo
December 1380 Bartol Tudisio 
May 1381 Miho Nicolice Martinusso
August 1381 Bartol Tudisio 
September 1381 Luca Bona 
October 1381 Andrija Dobre Bingola
November 1381 Luca Bona 
February 1382 Petar Gundulić
March 1382 Stijepo Luccari
April 1382 Miho Nikolice Martinusso
May 1382 Andrija Dobre Binzolla 
December 1382 Bartol Tudisio 
June 1384 Nikola Menze 
December 1386 Luka Bona 
February 1387 Miho Martinusso
May 1387 Ivan Grede 
July 1387 Luka Bona 
September 1387 Miho Nicolice Martinusso
December 1387 Pavao Gundulić 
September 1388 Mateo Georgio 
November 1388 Luka Bona 
January 1389 Pavao Gundulić 
May 1389 Nikola Gundulić
June 1389 Luka Bona 
October 1390 Pavao Gondula 
November 1390 Nikola Menze 
December 1390 Nikola Gondula 
January 1391 Luka Bona 
February 1391 Junio Sorgo 
March 1391 Raphael  Gozze
April 1391 Dimitrije Beneša
May 1391 Jakov Gondula  
June 1391 Pavao Gondula 
July 1391 Volzo Babalio
August 1391 Unuce Matessa 
September 1391 Andrija Menze
October 1391 Unuce Matessa 
November 1391 Marin Bodacia 
January 1392 Andrija Dobre Binzolla 
February 1392 Junio Sorgo 
March 1392 Nikola Gondula 
April 1392 Mateo Georgio 
May 1392 Miho Babalio
June 1392 Vlaho Sorgo 
July 1392 Marin Bodacia 
August 1392 Andrija Dobre Bincolla
September 1392 Junije Giorgi de Trippe
October 1392 Junio Sorgo 
November 1392 Nikola Gozze 
December 1392 Clemente Marini Gozze
May 1394 Clemente Marini Gozze 
June 1394 Nikola Menze 
July 1394 Vlaho Sorgo 
1395 Luka Bona
February 1396 Luka Bona
December 1396 Martin Rasti
15th century
June 1402 Andrija Volčić
August 1402 Ivan Volčić 
November 1403 Marin Bucignollo
January 1404 Vlaho Sorgo 
February 1404 Luca Bona 
April 1405 Martholo Marini Cerva
July 1405 Ivan Volčić 
September 1405 Miho Luccari
March 1406 Aloysius Gozze
July 1407 Marin Bodacia
April 1408 Šimun Bona
June 1408 Marin Martholi Bucignollo
August 1408 Božo Procullo
December 1408 Raphaele Goze
January 1409 Marin Bona
February 1409 Stijepo Luccari
June 1409 Marin Martholi Bucignolo  
October 1409 Matej Gradi 
November 1409 Paskval Resti
April 1410 Michael Menze
July 1410 Teodoro Prodanello
August 1410 Klement Bodacia
1410 Alojz Gozze
October 1410 Božo Proculo
November 1410 Ursio Zamagno
January 1411 Jakov Gundulić 
July 1411 Aloysio Gozze
August 1411 Clemente Bodacia  
September 1411 Nikola Ragnina
December 1411 Marin Cerva (acting) 
1411 Francho Basilio (acting)
February 1412 Paskval Resti
July 1412 Andrija Sorgo
October 1412 Nikola Gozze 
December 1412 Lampre Sorgo (during illness: Gauce Pozza)
December 1412 Mateo Gradi 
January 1413 Šimun Gozze
March 1413 Stijepo Lucari
June 1413 Miho Menze
October 1413 Lodovico Gozze
November 1413 Niko Pozza
January 1415 Ivan Volčić 
1415 Teodor Prodanello (acting for Volčić)
January 1417 Paskval Resti
July 1417 Raphael Gozze
December 1417 Volce Bobali
September 1418 Marin Junije Gundulić
June 1419 Paskval Resti
July 1419 Lovro Sorgo
August 1419 Theodoro Prodanello
September 1419 Nalcho Georgio
November 1419 Ivan Volčić 
December 1419 Andrija Martoli Volčić
January 1420 Junio Georgio
May 1420 Nikola Pozza
July 1420 Martholo Cerva
August 1420 Nikola Pozza
October 1420 Michael Sorgo
December 1420 Marin Sorgo
January 1421 Marin Resti
February 1421 Marin Junije Gradić 
May 1421 Marin Jakov Gundulić
July 1421 Petar Luccari
August 1421 Gauze Pozza
November 1421 Ivan Marin Gozze
December 1421 Džore Palmota
January 1422 Vlaho Sorgo
February 1422 Paskval Resti 
March 1422 Božo Proculo
April 1422 Nikola Goze
June 1422 Klement Resti
July 1422 Nalcho Georgio
September 1422 Nikola Petarv Pozza
October 1422 Thome Bona
November 1422 Lampre Sorgo
December 1422 Benedetto Gundulić
January 1423 Andrija Martoli Volčić
February 1423 Junije Georgio
April 1423 Mateo Gradi
May 1423 Clemente Bodacia 
June 1423 Marin Gundulić
September 1423 Raphael Gozze
October 1423 Nikola Pozza
November 1423 Martholo Cerva
December 1423 Ivan Marinov Gozze
January 1424 Marin Junije Gradi 
February 1424 Marin Gradi
March 1424 Marin Petri Cerva 
1424 Nalcho Georgio (acting)
May 1424 Ursio Zamagno
June 1425 Ivan Gundulić
September 1425 Andrija Vlahov Menze
May 1426 Martholo Zamagna
July 1426 Dobre Bincola
November 1426 Džore Palmota
December 1426 Džore Gozze
March 1427 Toma Bona
August 1427 Paskval Resti 
October 1427 Volzo Babalio
January 1428 Nikola P Pozza
March 1428 Nikola Marini Gozze
August 1428 Vito Klement Resti
October 1428 Petar Luccari
December 1428 Džore Palmota
January 1429 Andrija Martin Volčić
March 1429 Clemente Bodacia 
October 1429 Paskval Resti 
December 1430 Vito Resti
January 1431 Božo Proculo
February 1431 Ivan Gozze
June 1431 Petar Sorgo
July 1431 Niko Ivan Pozza
August 1431 Ivan Jakov Gundulić
October 1431 Nikola Georgio
November 1431 Ivan Andrija Volčić
June 1432 Frederic Gozze
November 1432 Martolo Cerva
December 1432 Miho Cerva
February 1433 Petar Bona (acting)
March 1433 Paladin Gundulić
April 1433 Andrija Volčić
June 1433 Matej Croce
October 1433 Ivan Gozze
December 1433 Marin Gundulić
February 1434 Ivan Volčić
October 1434 Aloysio Gozze
April 1435 Michael Cerva
January 1436 Gauze Pozza
March 1436 Ivan Volčić
June 1436 Martholo Zamagno 
August 1441 Andrija Babalio 
July 1442 Nikola Caboga
August 1442 Toma Sorgo
September 1442 Jakov Georgio
December 1442 Mateo Gradi 
January 1443 Župan Bona 
March 1443 Ivan Volčić
April 1443 Nikola Pozza
May 1443 Nikola Matei Georgio
September 1443 Marin Bona
October 1443 Marin Ju. Georgio
December 1443 Damjan Menze
February 1444 Andrija Babalio 
March 1444 Mihovil Bocignolo
May 1444 Junio Mato Gradi
October 1444 Ivan Menze
January 1445 Vlaho Ragnina
February 1445 Župan Bona 
March 1445 Vito Resti
April 1445 Petar Bona
June 1446 Marin Bona
November 1446 Antun Gozze
April 1447 Toma Sorgo
December 1447 Vlaho Ragnina
January 1449 Alojz Gozze
February 1449 Nikola Marin Caboga
May 1449 Sigismondo Georgio
March 1450 Junije Dobre Calich
November 1450 Martolo Zamagno
December 1450 Ivan Matej Georgio
March 1451 Stjepo Zamagno
1452 Bartol Gozze  
September 1453 Ivan Martin Cerva
October 1453 Nikola Pauli Gundulić
December 1453 Junije Calich
July 1454 Nikolin Basegli
August 1454 Nikola Matej Giorgi
August 1456 Lovro Ragnina
February 1457 Nikolin Basegli
April 1457 Damjan Menze
1457 Župan Bona 
February 1460 Ivan Andrija Volčić
April 1460 Junije Matej Gradi
December 1460 Andrija Resti
April 1465 Vladislav Gozze
September 1465 Vlaho Babalio 
December 1476 Raphael Marin Gozze
1481 Dragoe Gozze
1490 Michael Pozza
1490 Nicho Junius Georgio 
1490 Dragoe Aloisius Gozze
1490 Climento Marin Gozze
March 1490 Paladin Gundulić
June 1490 Nikola Marin Luccari
July 1490 Orsat Marin Bona
September 1490 Nikolin Martolo Cerva
October 1490 Maro Martholo Giorgi
November 1490 Naocho Nikola Saraka
December 1490 Nikola Ruschus Pozza
January 1491 Orsolin Nikola Vlachussa Menze
1492 Stijepo Gradi
16th century
1501 Ivan Gozze
1500 – 1501 Giunio Andrea Bobali 
1501 Šimun Beneša 
1501 – 1502 Brno Bona 
1503 - 1504 Junije Andrija Bobali 
1504 Šimun Beneša 
1505 - 1506 Frano Andrija Bobali 
1506 – 1507 Giunio Andrija Bobali 
1509 - 1510 Luca Bona 
1510 Antun Bona  
October 1511 Helius Cerva
1511 - 1512 Antun Bona 
1514 - 1515  Antun Bona 
1515 Sigismund Bonifacius Giorgi
1517 - 1518  Antun Bona 
1520 - 1521  Antun Bona 
1521 Jakov Bona  
December 1521 Šiško Menčetić 
1522 - 1523  Bartolo Bona  
1523 Antun Bona 
1523 Jakov Bona  
1524 Šiško Menčetić 
1525 - 1526  Luigi Bona 
1526 Stijepo Gradi (died in office) 
1526 Bartolo Bona  
1526 Antun Bona 
1526 Jakov Bona 
August 1527 Damianus Joannis Menze
1527 - 1528  Luigi Bona  
1528 - 1529  Mato Franov Bobali 
1529 - 1530  Luigi Bona 
1530 Frano Bona  
1530 Marin Zamagna 
1530 Jakov Bona 
January 1530 Ivan Paladini Gundulić
1530 - 1531 Miho Junije Bobali 
December 1531 Damjan Beneša 
1532 Frano Bona 
1532 Jakov Bona
1532 – 1533 Luigi Bona 
August 1534 Damjan Beneša  
1535 Mato Franov Bobali  
1535 Luigi Bona 
1535 Frano Bona 
1535 - 1536 Župan Bona  
1536 Girolamo Bona  
1536 Miho Šimun Bobali
1537 Frano Bona  
February 1537 Damjan Beneša 
1538 Mato Franov Bobali   
1538 - 1539 Frano Bona 
1539 Ilija Bona
1539 Girolamo Bona  
1539 - 1540 Mato Franov Bobali  
1540 Šimun Bobali 
1540 Pasko Cerva
1542 - 1543 Miho Giunio Bobali 
1543 Pasko Cerva
1543 - 1544 Mato Franov Bobali  
1545 - 1546 Miho Šimun Bobali 
1545 Marin Gučetić 
1546 – 1547 Mato Franov Bobali  
1546 Pasko Cerva
1547 Bernardo Bona 
1547 Marin Zamagna 
1547 – 1548 Župan Bona 
January 1549 Mato Franov Bobali  
1549 Paskal Frano Cerva 
1549 Pasko Cerva
1551 Ivan Marinov Gundulić 
1552 Pasko Cerva
December 1552 Serafin Bona
1554 Bernard Cerva  
1555 Župan Bona  
1555 Pasko Cerva
1555 Lucijan Bona
1557 Marin Gučetić 
1558 Pasko Cerva
1559  Jeronim Sigismund Bobali 
1559 Junije Miho Bobali 
1559 Lucijan Bona 
1560 Luka Mihov Bona
1560 Marin Bona 
1561 - 1562 Giunio Miho Bobali 
1562 Lovro Mihajlo Bobali  
1562 - 1563 Šimun Bobali
1564 - 1565 Lovro Miho Bobali   
1565 Junije Mihajlo Bobali  
April 1566 Ivan Marinov Gundulić 
1567 Giorgio Menze
1567 Marin Cerva
1568 - 1569 Junije Mihajlo Bobali 
1568 Rado Gučetić 
1569 Marin Cerva
1570 Lovro Mihajlo Bobali  
1570 – 1571 Jakov Antun Beneša 
1571 Marin Cerva 
1571 Luka Jako Cerva
June 1571 Frano Jeronim Gundulić 
1571 – 1572 Giunio Miho Bobali  
1572 - 1573 Jakov Antun Beneša  
1573 - 1575 Giunio Miho Bobali  
1574 Junije Bona
1575 Jakov Antun Beneša 
December 1575 Ivan Marinov Gundulić 
1576 Luka Jako Cerva
1576 Giorgio Menze 
1576 - 1577 Antun Bona 
1577 Girolamo Ghetaldi 
September 1577 Frano Jeronim Gundulić 
1577 - 1578 Natalio Proculo 
1578 Bernard Cerva  
February 1578 Ivan Marinov Gundulić 
1578 Marin Bona 
1578 – 1579 Jakov Antun Beneša 
1579 - 1580 Antun Bona 
1580 Vladimir Menze
1580 Luciano di Girolamo Bona 
1580 Junije Bona
1581 Jeronim Caboga
February 1581 Ivan Marin Gundulić 
1581 Trojan Cerva 
May 1583 Frano Jeronim Gundulić
1584 Trojan Cerva 
1584 Ivan Marinov Gundulić 
1587 – 1588 Ivan Binciola 
1588 - 1589 Matteo Beneša
1589 Rado Gučetić 
1589 Petar Beneša 
1589 Lujo Saraca 
1589 Petrus Cerva 
1591 Jero Bucchia
1592 Lujo Saraca 
1594 Miho Bunić Babulinović 
1600 Andro Luccari
17th century
1601 Antun Orsatov Gundulić
1602 Sabo Menze
1603 Marin Tudisi
December 1603 Giorgio Mar Gozze
?-? Dinko Ranjina (7 times)
?-? Nikola Vitov Gučetić (7 times)
1611 Frano Caboga 
1612 – 30 January 1612 Šiško Giorgi (died in office)
February 1612 Vladislav Menze
1612 Vlaho Gundulić 
March 1612 Rafael Bona
1613 Jakov Luccari
1614 Marin Sorgo
1615 Stijepo Prodanello
1616 Stjepan Proculo
1617 Lamprica Cerva
August 1617 Miho Bunić Babulinović (died in office)
1618 Jero Bona
1619 Niko Gozze
1620 Frano Sorgo
1621 Toma Basilio
1621 Ivan Palmotić 
1622 Đivo Menze
1623 Ivan Clasci
December 1623 Frano Gundulić 
June 1624 Ivan Palmotić 
1625 Miho Sorgo
May 1627 Ivan Palmotić 
May 1630 Ivan Palmotić 
1630 Jero Gozze
1630 Marin Menze
1631 Đivo Nika Gundulić
July 1633 Ivan Palmotić 
January 1636 Ivan Palmotić 
May 1639 Ivan Palmotić 
1639 Simone Menze
1640 Pavo Pozza 
1641 Džono Restić
May 1642 Ivan Palmotić 
1642 Luca Sorgo
1642 Ivan Bunić Vučić 
1643 Pavo Pozza 
May 1645 Ivan Palmotić 
1645 Ivan Bunić Vučić 
1648 Ivan Bunić Vučić 
?-? Ivan Marinov Gundulić
1651 Luciano Caboga 
1651 Ivan Bunić Vučić 
1652 Luca Sorgo 
1653 Savino Bona 
1654 Frano Ghetaldi 
1655 Marino Proculo  
1657 Ivan Bunić Vučić 
1660 Luko Gozze
1661 Marino Proculo  
1662 Pavao Menze
1662 Frano Sigismund Sorgo 
1663 Benedicto Bona 
1664 Simeone Menze 
1665 Luka Restić 
1667 -  6 Apr 1667 Šišmundo Getaldić (died in office)
May 1667 Nicola Bassegli
1667 Miho Menze
1670 Marino Sorgo 
July 1670 Šiško Gundulić 
1671 Ivan Matej Ghetaldi 
1671 Nikola Bona 
April 1671 Jaketa Palmotić Dionorić 
1672 Girolamo Menze 
1674 Nikola Bona 
July 1674 Jaketa Palmotić Dionorić 
July 1676 Šiško Gundulić 
December 1676 Mato Gundulić
1677 Nikola Bona 
September 1678 Mato Gundulić
August 1679 Šiško Gundulić 
1680 Clemenens Menze  
1681 Mato Bona 
June 1681 Mato Gundulić
September 1682 Šiško Gundulić (died in office) 
1682 Nicola Binciola 
1683 Clemenens Menze 
April 1684 - 23 April 1684 Mato Gundulić (died in office)
1684 Stijepo Tudisio
September 1688 Rafael Vladislavov Gozze 
October 1690 Mato Marinov Bona
November 1690 Rafael Vladislavov Gozze 
January 1691 Pavao Vladislavov Gozze
April 1691 - 22 Apr 1691 Junius Cerva (died in office)
1692 Lovrijenac Sorgo
1693 Rafael Gozze
1694 Ivan Karla Sorga
1695 Jero Menze
August 1695 Stjepan Bozov Proculo
1696 Dominko Bucchia
1696 Vladislav Bucchia 
1697 Marin Sorgo (died in office)
1697 Vladislav Gozze 
1699 Đivo Šiškov Gundulić
1699 Vladislav Bona
18th century
1701 Mato Marov Bona 
1702 Mato Marov Bona 
1703 Junius Gozze 
1703 Mato Marov Bona 
1706 Ivan Menze 
1707 Frano Tudisi 
1708 Junius Gozze 
1709 Ivan Menze 
1710 Luca Marini Sorgo 
?-? Ivan Sarov Bona (3 times)
1726 Ivan Gozze 
February 1721 Serafin Bunić-Vučičević
1726 – 27 March 1726 Vladislav Bucchia (died in office) 
1727 Ivan Basilio 
1728 Vladislav Sorgo 
1729 Ivan Gozze 
1730 Giunio Resti
1733 Vladislav Gozze 
1739 Vladislav Gozze
1752 Vlaho Menze
1754 Jakov Basilio
1755 Đivo Bucchia
1756 Marin Brnov Caboga
1757 Luka Mihov Bona 
1757 Niko Gozze
1758 Baldo Bucchia
1759 Orsat Cerva
1761 Dživo Sorgo
1762 Mato Zamagna  
1763 Miho Zamagna 
1763 Balthazar Gozze 
1764 Nicola Proculo 
1765 Luca Giorgi 
1767 Antun Resti 
1768 Savino Giorgi 
1769 Serafino Sorgo 
1769 Marino Tudisio 
1770 Marino Natalio Sorgo
1770 Ivan Raphaelle Gozze 
1771 Marin Tudisio and Frano Savino Ragnina
?-? Ivan Franatica Sorkočević (2 times)
1773 Nicola Proculo 
1774 Lukša Giorgi-Bona 
1775 Martolica Bosdari 
1776 Luka Zamagna 
1777 Balthazar Gozze 
1778 Luka Mihov Bona 
1786 Andrea Paoli
1787 Marin Tudisio 
1797 Marino Georgi 
1797 Giunio Resti 
1798 Ivan Basilio
1798 Klement Menze
1798 Antonio Marin Caboga
1798 Matteo Zamagna
1798 Orsat Gozze (died in office)
1800 Raphael Gozze
1800 Marino Bona 
?-? Antun-Bernard Mihov Giorgi-Bona (16 times)
?-? Bernard Marin Caboga (23 times)
19th century
1801 Frano Gozze 
1802 Matteo Ghetaldi 
1802 Martolica Cerva 
1802 Mato Ghetaldi 
1803 Vlaho Điva Bona 
1804 Đivo Vlaha Bona
1804 Miho Bona
1805 Mato Ghetaldi 
1805 Vlaho Điva Bona 
1806 Đivo Pijerka Natali 
1807 Giunio Resti 
28 December 1807 - 31 Jan 1808 Sabo Giorgi

References

Sources

https://www.worldstatesmen.org/Croatia.html#Ragusa

Republic of Ragusa
Chancellors (government)